HPR may refer to:
 Handley Page (Reading)
 HPR (gene)
 Harvard Political Review
 Hawaii Public Radio
 Heartland Public Radio
 HPR1, Heparanase
 High-power rocketry
 Highly Protected Risk in insurance; see FM Global
 Holding period return
 IBM Home Page Reader, spoken web browser
 Homiletic and Pastoral Review
 Hornsdale Power Reserve, a large battery in Australia
 Host plant resistance
 Hungarian People's Republic
 Pointing dog